Baščeluci is a settlement near the Serbian city of Loznica in the Mačva District. It has a population of 980.

Name
The name of the town in Serbian is plural.

Populated places in Mačva District